Tillabéri (var. Tillabéry) is one of the eight Regions of Niger; the capital of the Region is Tillabéri. Tillabéri Region was created in 1992, when Niamey Region was split, with Niamey and its immediate hinterland becoming a new capital district enclaved within Tillabéri Region.

Geography 
Tillabéri borders Mali (Gao Region) to the north, Tahoua Region to the east, Dosso Region to the southeast, Benin (Alibori Department) to the south, and Burkina Faso (Sahel Region and Est Region) to the west. The Niamey Capital District forms an enclave within the region. Tillabéri contains almost all of Niger's share of the Niger river, as well as several seasonal (known as Gorouol, Sirba) and permanent (known as Mékrou, Tapoa) watercourses. The W National Park is located in the extreme south of the region and extends into Burkina Faso and Benin. The northwestern areas of the region (Ouallam and Filingué) have a savannah type flora and fauna.

Settlements
Tillabéri is the regional capital; other major settlements include Abala, Ayourou, Banibangou, Bankilare, Filingue, Ouallam, Say, Téra and Torodi.

Administrative subdivisions

Tillabéri is divided into 6 departments:

Filingue Department
Kollo Department
Ouallam Department
Say Department
Téra Department
Tillabéri Department

Climate 
Tillabéri has a hot arid climate (BWh in the Köppen climate classification) despite receiving almost  of rainfall per year, due to the extreme heat and high evaporation.

Demographics
As of 2012 the population of the region was 2,722,482. The main ethnolinguistic group are the Fulani, Hausa, Tuareg, Zarma (also referred to as 'Djerma').

Economy
The economy of the region of Tillabéri is based primary on agriculture, livestock and fishery production. However, Tillabéri is rich in mineral resources (gold and iron ore) and increasingly becoming attractive for future mining investments. In 2004, the first gold mine in Téra began operation. In addition, the region of Tillabéri has great touristic potential with W Park, the Niger river and many more attractions.

Agriculture, livestock and fishery 
Based on data from the National Statistics Institute of Niger, The region of Tillaberi is 1st producer of rice (5,700 tonnes), 5th for sorghum (40,900 tonnes), 5th for millet (39,9400 tonnes), 3rd for corn (1,100 tonnes), 5th for black-eyed peas (15,3000 tonnes) and 5th in peanut (2,400 tonnes) in 2011 among regions. It is also an important livestock producer and the 1st producer of cattle with recorded 2087 thousand cattle heads in 2011. Although the Niger river is crossing through this region, it is only the 3rd producer of fishery products with 637 thousand tonnes in 2011.

Mining 
The region is home to the Samira Hill Gold Mine in Téra, which opened in 2004. In addition to gold, the region is rich in iron ore with estimated reserves of 650 million tonnes in Say.

Tourism 

The region of Tillabéri has many tourist sites. The W National Park of Niger, which straddles the tri-border area of Benin-Burkina Faso-Niger, is classified as a World Heritage Site by UNESCO. The park contains a wide variety of fauna and flora on side located in Niger.. The region has a modest hospitality infrastructure with only two 4-star hotels and 137 rooms (42 rooms for the 4 star hotels).

Crime 
Tillabéri is badly affected by the insurgency in the Maghreb. Major attacks occurred in January 2020, May 2020, August 2020 and January 2021.

See also
Departments of Niger
Regions of Niger
Communes of Niger

References

 
1992 establishments in Niger
Regions of Niger
States and territories established in 1992